Cleave may refer to:
Cleave (surname)
Cleave (fiber), a controlled break in optical fiber
RAF Cleave, was an airfield in the north of Cornwall, England, May 1939 - Nov 1945
The process of protein cleaving as a form of post-translational modification
 Cleave (Therapy? album), 2018
 "Cleaved" (Star vs. the Forces of Evil), a 2019 episode

See also
Cleavage (disambiguation)
Cleaver (disambiguation)
Cleeve (disambiguation)
Cleaves (surname)
Cleft (disambiguation)
Van Cleave